The year 1852 in science and technology involved some significant events, listed below.

Aeronautics

 September 24 – French engineer Henri Giffard makes the first airship trip, from Paris to Trappes.

Astronomy
 September 19 – Annibale de Gasparis discovers the asteroid 20 Massalia from the north dome of the Astronomical Observatory of Capodimonte in Naples.

Biology
 October 5 – American apiarist L. L. Langstroth patents the Langstroth hive for the cultivation of honey bees.
 Last recognised sighting of a great auk, on the Grand Banks of Newfoundland.

Chemistry
 August Beer proposes Beer's law, which explains the relationship between the composition of a mixture and the amount of light it will absorb. Based partly on earlier work by Pierre Bouguer and Johann Heinrich Lambert, it establishes the analytical technique known as spectrophotometry.

Mathematics
 October 23 – Francis Guthrie poses the four colour problem to Augustus De Morgan.

Medicine
 January 15 – Nine representatives of Hebrew charitable organizations come together to form what will become the Mount Sinai Hospital, New York.
 February 15 – The Great Ormond Street Hospital for Sick Children, London, admits its first patient.

Technology
 March 2 – The first American experimental steam fire engine, designed by Alexander Bonner Latta, is tested.
 The mechanical semaphore line in France is superseded by the electric telegraph.
 Captain E. M. Boxer of the Royal Arsenal devises an improvement to the shrapnel shell by insertion of an iron diaphragm, preventing premature ignition.
 French physicist Léon Foucault (1819–1868) makes the first gyroscope for scientific use

Awards
 Copley Medal: Alexander von Humboldt
 Wollaston Medal for Geology: William Henry Fitton

Births

 March 25 – Charles Loomis Dana (died 1935), American neurologist.
 April 10 – Arthur Vierendeel (died 1940), Belgian civil engineer.
 May 1 – Santiago Ramón y Cajal (died 1934), Spanish neuroscientist, winner of the Nobel Prize in Physiology or Medicine.
 August 4 – Catharine van Tussenbroek (died 1925), Dutch physician.
 August 30 – Jacobus van 't Hoff (died 1911), Dutch chemist.
 September 9 – John Henry Poynting (died 1914), English physicist, discoverer of the Poynting–Robertson effect and the Poynting vector.
 September 15 – Edward Bouchet (died 1918), African American physicist.
 September 23 – William Stewart Halsted (died 1922), American surgeon.
 September 28 – Isis Pogson (died 1945), English astronomer and meteorologist.
 October 2 – William Ramsay (died 1916), Scottish winner of the Nobel Prize in Chemistry.
 October 6 – Bruno Abakanowicz (died 1900), Polish mathematician, inventor and electrical engineer.
 October 9 – Hermann Emil Fischer (died 1919), German winner of the Nobel Prize in Chemistry.
 November 12 - Xavier Arnozan (died 1928), French physician.
 December 13 – Charles E. de M. Sajous (died 1929), American endocrinologist.
 December 15 – Henri Becquerel (died 1908), French physicist.

Deaths
 January 1 – John George Children (born 1777), English chemist, mineralogist and entomologist.
 January 6 – Louis Braille (born 1809), French inventor.
 January 13 - Jean-Nicolas Gannal (born 1791), French pharmacist, chemist, and inventor.
 August 15 – Johan Gadolin (born 1760), Finnish chemist.
 August 24 – Sarah Guppy (born 1770), English inventor.
 September 4 – William MacGillivray (born 1796), Scottish naturalist and ornithologist.
 September 8 – Anna Maria Walker (born 1778), Scottish botanist. 
 October 9 – Thomas Frederick Colby (born 1784), English cartographer.
 November 10 – Gideon Mantell (born 1790), English paleontologist.
 November 27 – Augusta Ada King (née Byron), Countess of Lovelace (born 1815), English computing pioneer.

References

 
19th century in science
1850s in science